Events in the year 1889 in Germany.

Incumbents

National level
 Kaiser – Wilhelm II
 Chancellor – Otto von Bismarck

State level

Kingdoms
 King of Bavaria – Otto of Bavaria
 King of Prussia – Kaiser Wilhelm II
 King of Saxony – Albert of Saxony
 King of Württemberg – Charles I of Württemberg

Grand Duchies
 Grand Duke of Baden – Frederick I
 Grand Duke of Hesse – Louis IV
 Grand Duke of Mecklenburg-Schwerin – Frederick Francis III
 Grand Duke of Mecklenburg-Strelitz – Frederick William
 Grand Duke of Oldenburg – Peter II
 Grand Duke of Saxe-Weimar-Eisenach – Charles Alexander

Principalities
 Schaumburg-Lippe – Adolf I, Prince of Schaumburg-Lippe
 Schwarzburg-Rudolstadt – George Albert, Prince of Schwarzburg-Rudolstadt
 Schwarzburg-Sondershausen – Karl Günther, Prince of Schwarzburg-Sondershausen
 Principality of Lippe – Woldemar, Prince of Lippe
 Reuss Elder Line – Heinrich XXII, Prince Reuss of Greiz
 Reuss Younger Line – Heinrich XIV, Prince Reuss Younger Line
 Waldeck and Pyrmont – George Victor, Prince of Waldeck and Pyrmont

Duchies
 Duke of Anhalt – Frederick I, Duke of Anhalt
 Duke of Brunswick – Prince Albert of Prussia (regent)
 Duke of Saxe-Altenburg – Ernst I, Duke of Saxe-Altenburg
 Duke of Saxe-Coburg and Gotha – Ernst II, Duke of Saxe-Coburg and Gotha
 Duke of Saxe-Meiningen – Georg II, Duke of Saxe-Meiningen

Colonial Governors
 Cameroon (Kamerun) – Julius Freiherr von Soden (2nd term) to 26 December, then Eugen von Zimmerer (acting governor) (2nd term)
 German East Africa (Deutsch-Ostafrika) – Hermann Wissmann (commissioner) (1st term)
 German New Guinea (Deutsch-Neuguinea) – Reinhold Kraetke (Landeshauptleute of the German New Guinea Company) to 31 October, then Fritz Rose (acting commissioner) from 1 November
 German South-West Africa (Deutsch-Südwestafrika) – Heinrich Ernst Göring (acting commissioner)
 Togoland – Eugen von Zimmerer (commissioner)
 Wituland (Deutsch-Witu) – Gustav Denhardt (resident)

Events 
 13 April – German company Rheinmetall was founded.
 14 June – Treaty of Berlin over Samoa
 3 October – German company K+S was founded.

Undated
 Old Age and Disability Insurance Bill of 1889

Births

 8 January – Paul Hartmann, German actor (died 1977)
 22 January – Willi Baumeister, German painter, scenic designer, professor of art and typographer (died 1955)
 1 February – Rudolf Bauer, German-American painter (died 1953)
 8 February – Siegfried Kracauer, German author, journalist, sociologist and (died 1966)
 3 March – Carl Vincent Krogmann, German banker and politician (died 1978)
 19 April – Otto Georg Thierack, German politician and jurist (died 1946)
 20 April – Adolf Hitler, German Führer and politician (died 1945)
 12 May – Otto Frank, German businessman (died 1980)
 23 May – Erich Engels, German screenwriter, producer and film director (died 1971)
 25 May – Günther Lütjens, German general (died 1941)
 11 June – Otto Dessloch, German Luftwaffe general and Knight's Cross recipient (died 1977)
 8 July – Hans Felber, German infantry general and Knight's Cross recipient (died 1962)
 20 July – Erich Pommer, German film producer and executive (died 1966)
 27 July – Hans von Opel, German industrialist (died 1948)
 29 July – Ernst Reuter, German politician (died 1953)
 21 September – Annemarie Steinsieck, German actress (died 1977)
 26 September – Martin Heidegger, German philosopher (died 1976)
 3 October – Carl von Ossietzky, German journalist and pacifist (died 1938)
 7 October:
Erich Büttner, German painter (died 1936)
Hans Tropsch, German chemist (died 1935)
 16 October – Reinhold Maier, German politician (died 1971)
 November 1 – Hannah Höch, German artist (died 1978)
 29 November – Margarete Haagen, German actress (died 1966)
 30 November – Hans Bischoff – German entomologist (died 1960)
 24 December – Friedrich-Karl Burckhardt, World War I German flying ace (died 1962)

Deaths

 19 January – Alexander von Monts, German admiral (born 1832)
 14 March – Friedrich Theodor von Frerichs, German pathologist (born 1819)
 26 March – C.F. Theodore Steinway, German piano maker (born 1825)
 5 August – Fanny Lewald, poet and actor (born 1811)
 21 December – Friedrich August von Quenstedt, geologist (born 1809)
 26 December – Hermann von Thile, diplomat (born 1812)
 27 December – Ernst Christian Friedrich Schering, apothecary and industrialist (born 1824)

References

 
Years of the 19th century in Germany
Germany
Germany
Germany